James "Jim" Logan (born September 17, 1933) is a Canadian ice hockey player.

Early life 
Logan was born in Toronto. He played junior hockey with the St. Michael's Buzzers.

Career 
Logan was a member of the Kitchener-Waterloo Dutchmen who won the bronze medal for Canada in ice hockey at the 1956 Winter Olympics. He was the leading scorer in the tournament with 15 points (seven goals and eight assists).

After retiring from professional hockey, Logan worked for an accounting firm in Greater Sudbury.

References

External links
Jim Logan's profile at SportsReference.com
bio

1933 births
Living people
Ice hockey people from Ontario
Ice hockey players at the 1956 Winter Olympics
Medalists at the 1956 Winter Olympics
Olympic bronze medalists for Canada
Olympic ice hockey players of Canada
Olympic medalists in ice hockey
Sportspeople from Whitby, Ontario
Toronto St. Michael's Majors players
Winnipeg Warriors (minor pro) players
Canadian ice hockey centres